The High Sheriff of County Galway was the Sovereign's judicial representative in County Galway. Initially an office for lifetime, assigned by the Sovereign, the High Sheriff became annually appointed from the Provisions of Oxford in 1258. Besides his judicial importance, he had ceremonial and administrative functions and executed High Court Writs.

The first (High) Shrivalties were established before the Norman Conquest in 1066 and date back to Saxon times. In 1908, an Order in Council made the Lord-Lieutenant the Sovereign's prime representative in a county and reduced the High Sheriff's precedence. However the office retained his responsibilities for the preservation of law and order in a county.

Elizabeth I, 1558–1603
1582: William Óge Martyn

James I, 1603–1625
1607: Henry Bingham / Robert Martin
1612: John Donelan

Charles I, 1625–1649
1641: William Donelan
1642: Ulick Burke of Castle Hacket
1644: Robert Martin of Ross

English Interregnum, 1649–1660

1655: Edward Ormsby of Tobervaddy
1656: Sir Arthur Gore, 1st Baronet
1659:

Charles II, 1660–1685

1660:
1666: Edmund Donelan of Cloghan, Roscommon
1672: Thomas Croadsdaile

1673:
1680: Edward Eyre
1681: John Eyre of Eyrecourt Castle
1684:

William III, 1689–1702

1689: John Power
1690:
1691:
1692:
1693:
1694: Thomas Coneys 

1695:
1696: Samuel Eyre 
1697:
1698:
1699:
1700: Sir George St George, 2nd Bt
1701: Henry Persse

Anne, 1702–1714

1702:
1703: Frederick Richard Trench
1704:
1705:
1706: George Eyre of Eyrecourt Castle
1707:

1708:
1709: Robert Blakeney of Castle Blakeney
1711: David Power of Corheen
1711: William Persse of Spring Garden
1712:
1713:

George I, 1714–1727

1714:
1720:
1721: Anthony Brabazon

1721: Thomas Croadsdaile
1723: Frederick Richard Trench (2nd term)
1724: John Eyre of Eyrecourt Castle
1726:

George II, 1727–1760

1727: John Blakeney of Abbert
1729: Robert Blakeney of Castle Blakeney
1731: Stratford Eyre
1734: Francis Persse of Ballymerret
1738: John Blakeney of Abbert
1742: Robert Persse
1743:

1744: Henry Croadsdaile of Woodford
1745:
1749: Richard Eyre
1754: Robert Blakeney of Abbert
1759:

George III, 1760–1820

1760:
1763: Theophilus Blakeney
1766: William Persse of Roxborough 
1768: John Blakeney of Ashfield
1774: Charles French, later Sir Charles ffrench, 1st Baronet
1775: Richard Croadsdaile of Woodford
1776: Theophilus Blakeney
1778: James Galbraith
1781: James Burke of Isercleran
1782: Richard Martin
1783: Redmond Dolphin of Corr
1784: Thomas Mahon of Rindify
1785: Martin Kirwan of Blindwell
1786: Michael Burke of Ballydugan
1789: Hyacinth Daly
1790: Garrett O'Moore, Snr.
1797: David Power of Loughrea
1798: Giles Eyre of Eyrecourt Castle
1799: William Gregory
1800: Sir John O'Flaherty
1801: Walter Lawrence
1802: Dominic Browne
1803: Frederick Trench of Garbally, Ballinasloe
1804: Robert O'Hara
1805: Sir John Taylor
1806: Edmond Netterville
1807: Arthur French St George
1808: John Kirwan
1809: Robert French
1810: Peter Blake
1811: James H. Burke and John D'Arcy
1812: James H. Burke
1813: James Staunton Lambert
1814: Robert Parsons Persse
1815: Richard Rathborne of Ballimore
1816: Burton Persse of Moyode Castle
1817: Thomas Wade
1818: Richard James Mansergh-St George
1819: John Henry Blakeney

George IV, 1820–1830

1820: Walter Lawrence of Lisreaghan
1821: Denis Henry Kelly
1822: William Malachy Burke of Ballydugan
1823: Robert Burke
1824: Robert Ffrench of Monivea Castle

1825: Edward Blake of Castle-grove, Tuam
1826: James Martin
1827: Walter Lambert of Castle Lambert
1828: Sir George Shee, 2nd Bt
1829:

William IV, 1830–1837

1830:
1833: Robert Bodkin

1834: James O'Hara of West Lodge
1835: Dudley Persse / James Knox Gildea
1836: John Cheevers of Killyan, Monivae

Victoria, 1837–1901

1837:
1838: Sir John Burke, 2nd Bt of Marble Hill
1840: Frederick Mason Trench
1841: Andrew William Blake of Furbough
1842: Denis Daly of Dunsandle
1843:
1844: Charles Kilmaine Blake / Hon. Standish Prendergast Vereker
1845: Denis Kirwan
1846: Christopher St George
1847: Michael Joseph Browne
1848: F. Blake of Creg Castle, Claregalway
1849: John Martin / William Henry Gregory
1850: Cornelius Joseph O'Kelly of Gallagh Castle
1851: Francis Manly Shaw Taylor
1852: Thomas Appleyard Joyce of Rahasane Park
1853: James Peter Daly
1854: Edward Eyre Maunsell
1855: Richard Andrew Hyacinth Kirwan † / succeeded by John Walter Henry Lambert of Aggard
1856: Stephen Roche
1857: FitzGerald Higgins
1858: Pierce Joyce of Merview, Galway
1859: Walter Peter Lambert of Castle Ellen
1860: Michael Joseph Chevers
1861: Cornelius Joseph O'Kelly, of Gallagh, Tuam
1862: Burton Robert Parsons Persse of Moyode Castle
1863: Richard D'Arcy of New Forest
1865: Hon. Luke Dillon
1866: John Archer Daly (né Blake) of Raford
1867: George Staunton Lynch-Stanton of Clydagh
1868: Walter Taylor Newton Shawe-Taylor of Castle Taylor

1869: Marcus Nicholas Lynch of Barna. / Thomas Redington Roche of Rye Hill.
1870: John Wilson Lynch of Duras and Renmore.
1873: John Blakeney of Abbert, Castle Blakeney.
1875: William St George Nugent, 10th Earl of Westmeath
1877: Hyacinth D'Arcy of New Forest.
1878: John Smyth of Masonbrook.
1879: James O'Hara of Lenaboy.
1880: James Francis MacDermott of Ramore.
1883: Sir Henry George Burke, 5th Baronet.
1884: Percy Brodrick Bernard of Castle Hacket.
1885: Robert Algernon Persse of Creg Clare, Andrahan. / Robert William Waithman
1886: Edward Joseph Martyn of Tulira.
1887: Sir Henry Grattan-Bellew, 3rd Bt.
1888: Stephen John Cowan.
1889: William Arthur Perrse.
1890: Francis Travers Dames-Longworth.
1891: Peter Fitzwalter Lambert of Castle Ellen.
1892: Frederic Thomas Lewin of Castlegrove.
1893: Francis John Graham of Drumgoon, Fermanagh and Ballinakill, Galway.
1894: Richard Berridge of Ballynahinch Castle.
1896: Hon. Robert Edward Dillon.
1897: Hon. Martin Morris.
1898: Quintin Dick Dick / Sir William Mahon, 5th Bt.
1899: William Arthur Persse of Roxborough.
1900:

Edward VII, 1901–1910

1901: William Daly of Dunsandal.
1902: William Sharp Waithman of Merlin Park.
1903: John Michael Aylward Lewis of Ballinagar.
1904: Edmond Joseph Philip Lynch-Athy of Renville.
1905:

1906: Charles Richard John O'Farrell of Dalyston.
1907: John Beresford Campbell of Moycullen House, Moycullen.
1908: John Joseph Smyth of Masonbrook.
1909: Arthur Henry Courtenay.
1910: Cecil Robert Henry of Toghermore and of Crumlin Park, Ballyglunin.

George V, 1910–1922

1911: Henry Thomas Hall.
1912: Pierce John Joyce.
1913: Thomas Frederic Lewin.
1914: Charles Randolph Kilkelly.
1915: Francis Manley Shawe-Taylor.
1916:

1917: Nicholas O'Connell Comyn.
1918:
1919: Charles Trench O'Rorke.
1920: James Gunning Alcorn.
1922:

Notes
† ?

References

 
Galway
History of County Galway